The International Conference on Business Process Management is an academic conference organized annually by the BPM community. The conference was first organized in 2003 Eindhoven, Netherlands.
Since then the conference has been organized annually. 
The conference is the premium forum for researchers, practitioners and developers in the field of Business Process Management (BPM).
The conference typically attracts over 300 participants from all over the world.

The BPM Steering Committee is responsible for the conference, including selection of organizers, invited speakers,  workshops, etc.

Topics 

Topics covered by the conference include:
 Business process modeling
 BPM/WFM systems
 Process mining
 Business process intelligence
 Workflow automation
 Process change management
 Reference process models
 Process modeling languages
 Case management
 Process variability and configuration
 Operations research for business processes
 Collaborative business process management
 Qualitative and quantitative process analysis (e.g. process simulation)
 Management aspects of BPM
 Decision management 
 Process discovery
 Process compliance
 Process innovation
 Process execution architectures

History 

The first conference was organized by Wil van der Aalst and was held in conjunction with the 24th International Conference on Applications and Theory of Petri Nets in Eindhoven. Since BPM 2005 in Nancy, the conference has co-located workshops in different subfields of BPM.

 BPM 2023 in Utrecht, Netherlands
General Chair: Hajo Reijers
PC Co-Chairs: Shazia Sadiq, Chiara Di Francescomarino, Andrea Burattin, Christian Janiesch
Workshop Chairs: Luise Pufahl, Jochen De Weerdt
 BPM 2022 in Münster, Germany
 PC Co-Chairs: Adela del Río Ortega, Claudio Di Ciccio, Remco Dijkman, Stefanie Rinderle-Ma
General Chair: Jörg Becker
Workshop Chairs: Cristina Cabanillas, Agnes Koschmider, Niels Frederik Garmann-Johnsen
 BPM 2021 in Rome, Italy
PC Co-Chairs: Artem Polyvyanyy, Moe Thandar Wynn, Amy Van Looy, Manfred Reichert
General Chair: Massimo Mecella
Workshop Chairs: Andrea Marrella, Barbara Weber
 BPM 2020 in Sevilla, Spain
PC Co-Chairs: Dirk Fahland, Chiara Ghidini, Jörg Becker, Marlon Dumas
General Chair: Manuel Resinas, Antonio Ruiz-Cortés
Workshop Chairs: Adela del-Río-Ortega, Henrik Leopold, Flavia M. Santoro
BPM 2019 in Vienna, Austria
PC Co-Chairs: Thomas Hildebrandt, Boudewijn van Dongen, Maximilian Röglinger, Jan Mendling
General Chair: Jan Mendling, Stefanie Rinderle-Ma
Workshop Chairs: Remco Dijkman, Chiara di Francescomarino, Uwe Zdun
BPM 2018 in Sydney, Australia 
 PC Co-Chairs: Mathias Weske, Marco Montali, Ingo Weber, Jan vom Brocke
 General Chair: Boualem Benatallah and Jian Yang
 Workshop Chairs: Florian Daniel, Hamid Motahari, Michael Sheng
 BPM 2017 in Barcelona, Spain
 PC Co-Chairs: Josep Carmona, Gregor Engels, Akhil Kumar
 General Chair: Josep Carmona
 Workshop Chairs: Matthias Weidlich, Ernest Teniente
 BPM 2016 in Rio de Janeiro, Brazil
 PC Co-Chairs: Marcello La Rosa, Peter Loos, Oscar Pastor
 General Chair: Flávia Santoro
 Workshop Chairs: Marlon Dumas, Marcelo Fantinato
BPM 2015 in Innsbruck, Austria 
 PC Co-Chairs: Hamid Reza Motahari-Nezhad, Jan Recker, Matthias Weidlich
 General Chair: Barbara Weber
 BPM 2014 in Eindhoven, Netherlands (relocated from Haifa, Israel) 
 PC Co-Chairs: Shazia Sadiq, Pnina Soffer, Hagen Völzer
 General Co-Chairs: Avigdor Gal, Mor Peleg
 Local Chair: Wil van der Aalst
 BPM 2013 in Beijing, China 
 PC Co-Chairs: Florian Daniel, Jianmin Wang, Barbara Weber
 General Chair: Jianmin Wang
BPM 2012 in Tallinn, Estonia
 PC Co-Chairs: Alistair Barros, Avi Gal, Ekkart Kindler
 General Chair: Marlon Dumas
 BPM 2011 in Clermont-Ferrand, France 
 PC Co-Chairs: Stefanie Rinderle-Ma, Farouk Toumani, Karsten Wolf
 General Chair: Farouk Toumani, Mohand-Said Hacid
 BPM 2010 in Hoboken (NJ), United States  
 PC Co-Chairs: Richard Hull, Jan Mendling, Stefan Tai
 General Chair: Michael zur Mühlen
 BPM 2009 in Ulm, Germany 
 PC Co-Chairs: Umeshwar Dayal, Johann Eder, Hajo A. Reijers
 General Chairs: Peter Dadam, Manfred Reichert
 BPM 2008 in Milan, Italy 
 PC Co-Chairs: Marlon Dumas, Manfred Reichert, Ming-Chien Shan
 General Chair: Barbara Pernici
 BPM 2007 in Brisbane, Australia  
 PC Co-Chairs: Gustavo Alonso, Peter Dadam, Michael Rosemann
 General Chairs: Marlon Dumas, Michael Rosemann
 BPM 2006 in Vienna, Austria  
 PC Co-Chairs: Schahram Dustdar, José Luiz Fiadeiro, Amit P. Sheth
 General Chair: Schahram Dustdar
 BPM 2005 in Nancy, France 
 PC Co-Chairs: Wil M. P. van der Aalst, Boualem Benatallah, Fabio Casati
 General Chair: Claude Godart
 BPM 2004 in Potsdam, Germany 
 PC Co-Chairs: Jörg Desel, Barbara Pernici, Mathias Weske
 General Chair: Mathias Weske
 BPM 2003 in Eindhoven, Netherlands
 PC Co-Chairs: Wil van der Aalst, Arthur H. M. ter Hofstede, Mathias Weske
 General Chair: Wil van der Aalst

See also 
 The list of computer science conferences contains other academic conferences in computer science.
 The topics of the conference cover the field of computer science.
 Process mining is a process management technique that allows for the analysis of business processes based on event logs.
 Business Process Management (BPM)  includes methods, techniques, and tools to support the design, enactment, management, and analysis of operational business processes. It can be considered as an extension of classical Workflow Management (WFM) systems and approaches.

References

External links 
 Website of the BPM Conference Series.
 BPM Steering Committee
 Website of the 15th International Conference on Business Process Management, Barcelona, September 2017.
 DBLP entry listing all BPM conference proceedings (including workshops)
 BPM Newsletters (two issues per year)

Computer science conferences
Recurring events established in 2003